The 1958 Sugar Bowl featured the seventh-ranked Ole Miss Rebels and the eleventh-ranked Texas Longhorns.

Background
This was the first game broadcast by NBC.

Game summary
In the first quarter, Ole Miss quarterback Raymond Brown scored on a 1-yard touchdown run as the Rebels took a 6–0 lead. He finished the game with 157 yards rushing on 15 carries. In the second quarter, Brown threw a 3-yard touchdown pass to Don Williams as Ole Miss led 13–0. Kent Lovelace scored on a 9–yard run as Ole Miss led 19–0 at halftime.

In the third quarter, Bobby Franklin scored on a 3-yard run as Ole Miss led 26–0. Texas scored on a 1-yard touchdown run by George Blanch to narrow the score to 26–7. Brown scored on a 92-yard touchdown run making the score 33–7. Billy Brewer's 12-yard touchdown pass to Tommy Taylor made the final score 39–7.

References

Sugar Bowl
Sugar Bowl
Ole Miss Rebels football bowl games
Texas Longhorns football bowl games
Sugar Bowl
Sugar Bowl